The Queensland Sport and Athletics Centre (QSAC), more commonly known by its former names ANZ Stadium or QE II / Queen Elizabeth II Jubilee Sports Centre / QE2 Stadium, is a major multi-purpose sporting facility on the south side of Brisbane, Australia. From 1993 to 2003, QSAC was the home of the Brisbane Broncos, who play in National Rugby League. The venue is one of Olympic Stadium options in planned South East Queensland bid for 2032 Summer Olympics with Brisbane Cricket Ground to host ceremonies and athletics. It had earlier also bid for 2009-2013 World Athletics Championships.

History 
The facility opened in 1975 providing a synthetic running track for athletics competitions that was unaffected by wet weather. It was officially named Queen Elizabeth II Jubilee Sports Centre by the Queen in 1977 to mark her Silver Jubilee. It was constructed in close proximity to both the Queen Elizabeth II Jubilee Hospital and Griffith University campus, which provided athlete accommodation.

Originally the section of the stadium covered by roofing was intended to be the only permanent seating facility. The remainder of the stadium seating was built as "temporary" seating and was intended to be removed after the Commonwealth Games had finished. Public opinion resulted in the unroofed temporary seating being retained as permanent. 

The stadium was named ANZ Stadium from 1993 to 2003 when it was the home of the Brisbane Broncos rugby league football team. The stadium currently has a capacity of 48,500 people, although the record crowd is 58,912, set during the 1997 Super League Grand Final which saw the Broncos defeat the Cronulla-Sutherland Sharks 26–8. The capacity can be increased to 60,000 with the use of extra temporary seating in front of the Eastern and Western grandstands. These were removed when the running track was relaid for the 2001 Goodwill Games.

In 1999, ANZ Stadium hosted eventual champions Australia in their Davis Cup Semi-Final win over Russia 4–1. Temporary grass courts were erected up one end of the field and temporary stands on 3 sides. The crowd capacity for this event was 10, 600. 1999 Australian Open Champion and Russian Davis Cup player Yevgeny Kafelnikov described the court "like playing on a potato field" and "that court is just not acceptable for this kind of event."

In 2002, ownership transferred to the Queensland Government Major Sports Facilities Authority and the venue was given its present name.

While the athletics facilities are well utilised, the stands at the stadium have largely stood empty and unused since the Broncos returned to a redeveloped Lang Park in 2003.

The stadium has hosted a number of events, including:
11 editions of the Australian Championships in Athletics, the most of any existing venue
1982 – 1982 Commonwealth Games
1985 – Bruce Springsteen & The E Street Band – 31 March 1985
1986 – Dire Straits, Brothers-in-Arms tour – 27 March 1986
1993 – U2 with Big Audio Dynamite II and Kim Salmon and the Surrealists – 20 November 1993
1993 – Madonna – 24 November 1993
1994 – 1994 Rugby League World Club Challenge
1995 – The Rolling Stones – 12 April 1995
1995 – The Eagles – 24 November 1995
1996 – Michael Jackson HIStory World Tour, 40,000 people – 19 November 1996
1997 – Super League Grand Final 1997
1998 – U2 with Sidewinder – 25 February 1998
1999 – 1999 Davis Cup Semi-Final tie vs. Russia
2001 – Goodwill Games
2001/2002 – State of Origin series games
2002 – An assignment on the third season of The Mole, filmed in early 2002, where the contestants had to draw an animal using the painting machines normally used to mark the playing fields.
2006 – U2 with Kanye West – 7 November 2006
2009 – Pearl Jam with Relentless7 – 25 November 2009
2010 – AC/DC with Wolfmother – 25 and 27 February 2010
2010–2011 –  This venue served as an evacuation centre for residents affected by the 2010–2011 Queensland floods
2014 – Matildas vs Brazil – 6 and 9 April 2014
2014 – 2014 FFA Cup round of 16 match between Olympic FC and Central Coast Mariners – 16 September 2014
2015 – AC/DC with The Hives – 12 and 27 November 2015
2017 – Guns N' Roses with Rose Tattoo – 7 February 2017
2018 – International friendly football match between South Korea and Uzbekistan – 20 November 2018
2018 – Bon Jovi, This House Is Not For Sale Tour – 6 December 2018
2019 – Eminem with Hilltop Hoods – 20 February 2019

The stadium is still actively used by athletes at a local, State and National level Many local clubs such as Thompson Estate and Eastern Suburbs Athletics use it regularly for training.

The stadium has also permitted students of the neighbouring Griffith University (Nathan campus) to use its expansive carpark, free of charge. This is due to the relatively low availability of parking as well as the cost of parking on the campus (there is no free parking). Students who don't mind the ten-minute walk from the stadium take advantage of the large carpark.

Notable Rugby League Games

See also

 List of tennis stadiums by capacity

References

External links

 QSAC
 ‘Potato field’ & not court: Kafelnikov
 Brisbane to host Australia-Russia Davis Cup semi-final

Athletics (track and field) venues in Australia
Baseball venues in Australia
Rugby league stadiums in Australia
Sports venues in Brisbane
1982 Commonwealth Games venues
Brisbane Broncos
1975 establishments in Australia
Sports venues completed in 1975
A-League Women stadiums
Sports complexes in Australia
Silver Jubilee of Elizabeth II